Pavel Padrnos (born 17 December 1970) is a Czech former professional road racing cyclist, most recently with  whom he was with between 2002 and 2007. His major individual success is the win in Peace Race in 1995. He competed at the 1992 Summer Olympics and the 2000 Summer Olympics.

During the 2004 Tour de France the UCI were discussing whether Padrnos and Stefano Zanini of  would be allowed to continue the Tour. This was because both riders had been called to appear in a case relating to doping at the 2001 Giro d'Italia. The UCI decided to let the riders continue.

Major results
Sources:

1988
 3rd Overall Pays de Vaud Juniors
1990
 1st Stage 6 Grand Prix Guillaume Tell
 3rd Overall Course de la Paix
1992
 2nd Overall Okolo Slovenska
 2nd Overall Tour de Berlin
1993
 1st GP ZTS Dubnica
 3rd Overall Course de la Paix
1st Stage 6b (ITT)
1994
 1st  Overall Bayern Rundfahrt
 1st  Overall Ytong Bohemia Tour
 1st Hessen Rundfahrt
 7th Overall Course de la Paix
1st Stage 6
1995
 1st  Overall Niedersachsen Rundfahrt
1st Prologue & Stage 1
 1st  Overall Course de la Paix
1st Stages 3, 5, 8a & 9
 1st Hessen Rundfahrt
1996
 1st Stages 4 & 8 Okolo Slovenska
1997
 6th Overall Vuelta a Murcia
2003
 1st Stage 4 (TTT) Tour de France
2004
 1st Stage 4 (TTT) Tour de France
2005
 1st Stage 4 (TTT) Tour de France

Grand Tour general classification results timeline

References

External links

1970 births
Living people
Czech male cyclists
Cyclists at the 1992 Summer Olympics
Cyclists at the 2000 Summer Olympics
Olympic cyclists of Czechoslovakia
Olympic cyclists of the Czech Republic
People from Třebíč District
Sportspeople from the Vysočina Region